Lesbian, gay, bisexual, and transgender (LGBT) persons in Curaçao may face legal challenges not experienced by non-LGBT residents. Both male and female same-sex sexual activity are legal in Curaçao, aswell as same-sex marriage. Discrimination on the basis of "heterosexual or homosexual orientation" is outlawed by the Curaçao Criminal Code. Despite this, same-sex adoption is still not recognised.

Law regarding same-sex sexual activity
Same-sex sexual activity is legal in Curaçao. The age of consent is 16 and is equal for both heterosexual and homosexual intercourse.

Recognition of same-sex relationships

As part of the Kingdom of the Netherlands, Curaçao must recognize same-sex marriages registered in the Netherlands as well as in Bonaire, Sint Eustatius and Saba (also known as the Caribbean Netherlands) as valid. Despite this, same-sex couples cannot legally marry on the island itself nor are civil unions or other forms of recognition available.

In April 2015, representatives of all four constituent countries agreed that same-sex couples should have equal rights throughout the Kingdom.

In August 2015, in the case of Oliari and Others v Italy, the European Court of Human Rights (ECHR) ruled that it is discriminatory to provide no legal recognition to same-sex couples. The ECHR has jurisprudence over Curaçao.

In 2017, a proposal to grant same-sex couples some limited rights was introduced to the Estates of Curaçao.

In September 2018, during the sixth edition of Curaçao Gay Pride, the local LGBT rights organizations FOKO Curaçao, Equality Curaçao and Curaçao Gay Pro handed over a bill to Vice President of Parliament Giselle McWilliam that would allow same-sex couples to marry in Curaçao. McWilliam applauded the action saying, "I think it's great. It shows that democracy is alive on Curaçao. That initiatives can come not only from the parliament or the government, but also from the people themselves. Everyone has the right to submit a bill, I am going to do everything to help this group, because they are also part of it." According to Prime Minister Eugene Rhuggenaath, who attended the parade, it is now time to debate the issue. He said, "Exclusion and discrimination against the LGBT community affects human rights." On 4 June 2019, the bill was submitted to the Estates of Curaçao, but later withdrawn in September 2020 from lack of support.

Discrimination protections
The Curaçao Criminal Code, enacted in 2011, prohibits unfair discrimination and incitement to hatred and violence on various grounds, including "heterosexual or homosexual orientation". Article 1:221 describes discrimination as "any form of discrimination, exclusion, restriction or preference, which has the purpose or effect of impacting or affecting recognition, enjoyment or the exercise of human rights and fundamental liberties in political, economic, social or cultural fields or in other areas of social life." Articles 2:61 and 2:62 provide for penalties ranging from fines to one year imprisonment.

Living conditions
Curaçao has a large tourism industry. Several venues, hotels and restaurants openly cater to LGBT tourists. The island is frequently referred to as one of the Caribbean's most LGBT-friendly areas, and has the highest membership rate of businesses in the International Gay and Lesbian Travel Association in the Caribbean. Curaçao possesses quite a large gay scene, with the first pride parade having occurred in 2012. There are several LGBT associations on the island, including Equality Curaçao (Igualdat Kòrsou), FOKO Curaçao (Fundashon Orguyo Kòrsou) and Curaçao Gay Pro.

Despite this, local LGBT people have reported that discrimination and family rejections still exist. The Roman Catholic Church has a strong influence on the island, and has often opposed proposals and discussions aimed at improving LGBT rights.

In September 2017, in a speech called "historical" by LGBT activists, Prime Minister Eugene Rhuggenaath called for more acceptance at the Gay Pride parade in Willemstad.

Summary table

See also

LGBT rights in the Netherlands
LGBT rights in the Americas
LGBT rights in Aruba
LGBT rights in Sint Maarten
Same-sex marriage in Aruba, Curaçao and Sint Maarten
Politics of Curaçao

Notes

References